The Triumph Sprint 900 is a sport touring motorcycle manufactured by Triumph from 1991 to 1998 at their factory in Hinckley, Leicestershire. Styled by Rod Skiver, the Sprint was powered by an  liquid-cooled, inline-three four stroke engine. The engine was a similar triple to that in the Triumph Trident 900 and many of the cycle parts were interchangeable with the Trident.

Originally called the "Trident Sprint", it became the "Sprint 900" in 1995.The bike was succeeded by the Triumph Sprint RS,  and also by the Triumph Sprint ST.

Reception
One review declared that the Sprint was, "basically a Trident 900 with a cockpit fairing, but that didn't prevent it being a solid workhorse tourer".

References

Sprint 900
Sport touring motorcycles
Motorcycles introduced in 1991